Barikot is an administrative subdivision (tehsil) of Swat District in the Khyber Pakhtunkhwa province of Pakistan.

Swat District has seven tehsils i.e. Tehsil Barikot, Tehsil Babuzai, Tehsil Matta, Tehsil Khwaza Khela,  Tehsil Kabal, Tehsil Charbagh and Tehsil Bahrain. Each Tehsil comprises certain numbers of Union council. There are 65 Union council in district Swat, 56 rural and 09 urban.

According to Khyber Pakhtunkhwa Local Government Act 2013. Tehsil Barikot have following 5 Wards:

 Ghalegay
 Barikot
 Tindodag
 Panjigram
 Najigram
 Nawagai
 Amlok Dara
 Karakar
 Kandak Jehangir
 Parrai
 Kota
 Shamozai
 Guratai
 Manyar
 Landakay
 New kalai
 Shingardar
 Nagoha
 Dedawar 
 zarakhela 
 Chungi

See also 

Swat District

References

External links
 Book: Hidden Treasures of Swat, 
Khyber-Pakhtunkhwa Government website section on Lower Dir and neighboring places
United Nations
Hajj 2014 Uploads
 PBS paiman.jsi.com 

Swat District
Tehsils of Swat District
Populated places in Swat District